Gornje Košlje is a village in Serbia. It is situated in the Ljubovija municipality, in the Mačva District of Central Serbia. The village had a Serb ethnic majority and a population of 649 in 2002.

Historical population

1948: 1,258
1953: 1,323
1961: 1,378
1971: 1,103
1981: 989
1991: 781
2002: 649

See also
List of places in Serbia

References

Populated places in Mačva District
Ljubovija